Julie Livingston (born 1966) is an American medical historian and the Julius Silver Professor at New York University. She won a 2013 MacArthur Fellowship.

Life
Livingston received her B.A. in Comparative Religion from Tufts University. She graduated from Boston University with an M.A. in African History, M.P.H. in Health Services and a Certificate of Public Health in Developing Countries, and from Emory University with a Ph.D. in African History.
She taught at Rutgers University from 2003 to 2015.

Publications
Select books:
 Breast sweeping, cesarean section, and high blood : ideas about aging in postcolonial Botswana, 2000
 "Long ago we were still walking when we died" : disability, aging and the moral imagination in southeastern Botswana, 2001
 Debility and moral imagination in Botswana : disability, chronic illness, and aging, 2005
 Improvising medicine : an African oncology ward in an emerging cancer epidemic, 2012
 Self-devouring growth : a planetary parable as told from Southern Africa, 2019

References

1966 births
Living people
American medical historians
Tufts University School of Arts and Sciences alumni
Boston University alumni
Emory University alumni
Rutgers University faculty
Boston University School of Public Health alumni
MacArthur Fellows
Date of birth missing (living people)